Combat 18 (C18 or 318) is a neo-Nazi terrorist organisation that was founded in 1992. It originated in the United Kingdom, with ties to movements in Canada and the United States. Since then it has spread to other countries, including Germany. Combat 18 members have been suspected of being involved and directly responsible in the deaths of numerous immigrants, non-whites, German politician Walter Lübcke and other C18 members.

On 21 June 2019, the government of Canada added Combat 18 (alongside its affiliate Blood & Honour) to its list of terrorist organisations, which was the first time that a far-right group was added to the list. Members in the UK are barred from joining the British Prison Service, the armed forces and police. On 23 January 2020, the German government announced a ban of the German offshoot of Combat 18.

Name
Combat 18's name is often abbreviated "C18". The "18" in its name is derived from the initials of the Nazi German leader Adolf Hitler: A and H are the first and eighth letters of the Latin alphabet.

History

Founding
In early 1992, the far-right British National Party (BNP) formed Combat 18 as a stewarding group whose purpose was to protect its events from anti-fascists. Its founders included Charlie Sargent and Harold Covington.

C18 soon attracted national attention for threats of violence against immigrants, members of ethnic minorities and leftists. In 1992, it started publishing the Redwatch magazine, which contained photographs, the names and addresses of political opponents. Combat 18 is an openly neo-Nazi group that is devoted to violence and hostile to electoral politics, and for this reason Sargent split decisively from the BNP in 1993.

1997: murder of Christopher Castle
Sargent split with his former C18 colleagues over allegations that he was an informer for the British security services. The rival faction, led by Wilf "The Beast" Browning, wanted Sargent to return the C18 membership list, in exchange for the return of his plastering tools and £1,000. However, such was the animosity and fear between them that a mutually acceptable go-between, 28-year-old C18 member "Catford Chris" Castle, was driven to Sargent's mobile home in Harlow, Essex, by Browning, who waited in the car, while Castle went to visit Sargent. He was met at the door by Charlie Sargent and his political associate as well as former Skrewdriver guitarist Martin Cross. Cross plunged a nine-inch (22 cm) blade into Castle's back. Browning took Castle to hospital in a taxi, but doctors were unable to save him and he died shortly after arrival.

Despite Sargent's attempt to implicate Browning, Sargent was convicted of murder at Chelmsford Crown Court the following year. He and Cross were sentenced to life imprisonment. Cross remains in prison and, following a short period on licence, Sargent was returned to custody on the weekend of 15 November 2014.

Post-Sargent history
Between 1998 and 2000, dozens of Combat 18 members in the United Kingdom and Ireland were arrested on various charges during dawn raids by the police. These raids were part of several operations which were conducted by Scotland Yard in co-operation with MI5. Those arrested included Steve and Bill Sargent (Charlie Sargent's brothers), David Myatt and two serving British soldiers, Darren Theron (Parachute Regiment) and Carl Wilson. One of those whose house was raided was Adrian Marsden, who later became a councillor for the British National Party (BNP). Several of those arrested were later imprisoned, including Andrew Frain (seven years) and Jason Marriner (six years).

Some journalists believed that the White Wolves are a C18 splinter group, alleging that the group had been set up by Del O'Connor, the former second-in-command of C18 and a member of Skrewdriver Security. The document issued by the White Wolves announcing their formation has been attributed to David Myatt, whose Practical Guide to Aryan Revolution allegedly inspired the nailbomber David Copeland, who was jailed for life in 2000 after being found guilty of causing a series of bombings in April 1999 that killed three people and injured many others.

A group calling itself the Racial Volunteer Force split from C18 in 2002, although it has retained close links to its parent organisation. On 28 October 2003, German police officers conducted raids on 50 properties in Kiel and Flensburg that were believed to be linked to German supporters of the group. The Anti-Defamation League says there are Combat 18 chapters in Illinois, Florida and Texas. On 6 September 2006, the Belgian police arrested 20 members of Combat 18 Flanders. Fourteen of them were soldiers in the Belgian army.

C18 has long been associated with loyalists in Northern Ireland. In July 2008, "C18" was painted on St Mary's Oratory in County Londonderry. On 18 June 2009, graves belonging to numerous people, including Provisional Irish Republican Army hunger-striker Bobby Sands were desecrated with C18 graffiti. Racist attacks on immigrants continue from members of C18. Weapons, ammunition and explosives have been seized by police in the UK and almost every country in which C18 is active. In late 2010, five members of Combat 18 Australia (among them Jacob Marshall Hort and Bradley Neil Trappitt) were charged over an attack on a mosque in Perth, Western Australia. Several rounds were fired from a high-powered rifle into the Canning Turkish Islamic Mosque, causing over $15,000 damage.

The online forum presence of Combat 18 was officially ended at the end of November 2014, with the Combat 18 forum redirecting to a US-based nationalist video and DVD merchandising store which now owns the domain. On 6 March 2018, eight members of Combat 18 were arrested in Athens, Greece, accused of multiple attacks on immigrants and activists. They had 50 kg of ANFO in their possession.

On 23 January 2020, an important day in German history, because 75 years previously, Allied forces liberated the Auschwitz concentration camp, the German Minister of Interior banned Combat 18 nationwide in Germany. More than 200 police officers carried out raids in six German states seizing mobile phones, computers, unspecified weaponry, Nazi memorabilia and propaganda material.

The murder of Walter Lübcke
An alleged member of the German branch of Combat 18 named Stephen Ernst was the suspect in the case of the murdered local politician Walter Lübcke of the Christian Democratic Union of Germany. Ernst confessed to the crime on 25 June 2019. The Federal Minister of the Interior, Horst Seehofer, then announced his intention to ban the organisation in Germany.

Links with football hooliganism

Members of the organisation include known football hooligans and groups. The most high-profile incident involving Combat 18 members in football came on 15 February 1995, when violence broke out in the stands at Lansdowne Road in the international friendly between Ireland and England. There was also taunting of "No Surrender to the IRA" aimed at Irish fans. The violence was so bad that the match had to be abandoned.

Before the 1998 FIFA World Cup, 26 Seaburn Casuals (Sunderland AFC supporters) hooligans were arrested in a police raid after a military-issue smoke bomb was let off at a local pub after a fight with bouncers. By the end of the operation, over 60 were facing charges. Some of the Seaburn Casuals hooligans arrested in were involved with Combat 18. The operation failed when a judge ruled that CCTV footage from the pub was inadmissible as evidence.

Canada terrorism list 
Due to concerted efforts by Canadians on 21 June 2019, two neo-Nazi/alt-right groups were added to the Canadian terrorist list. This is in part due to Canada's response to the Christchurch mosque shootings and a petition to Canada's Federal Government: EPetition e-2019 by #NoPlace2Hate. This means that criminal acts by members of this group now additionally fall under Canada's Criminal Code for Terrorism which can include additional prison sentences for criminal acts including financial contributions to a known terrorist organisation.

Ban in Germany 
On 23 January 2020, the German government announced and enforced an order banning "Combat 18 Deutschland", the German offshoot of Combat 18. The order by the Ministry of the Interior states that "Combat 18 Deutschland" is directed against the constitutional order and that its goals and activities are contrary to criminal laws and against the idea of understanding among nations. The order stipulates that the organisation be dissolved and that all assets of the organisation be seized and confiscated; in addition, signs of the organisation must no longer be used and no replacement organisation may be formed. On the day of the announcement, more than 200 police officers raided the homes of the organisation's leading members. According to the government, at the time of the ban the organisation had "approximately 20 members" and "an unknown number of sympathisers". The Interior Ministry linked the decision to the murder of Walter Lübcke and the Halle synagogue shooting.

"Combat 18 Deutschland" filed suit against the ban in the Federal Administrative Court and asked the court to preliminarily enjoin the ban's enforcement pending a decision on the merits. In September 2020, the court rejected the latter request, stating that the public interest in the immediate enforcement of the ban prevailed over the organisation's interests, further noting that the challenge against the ban will likely not succeed as the court's summary examination of the merits suggests that the organisation's activities are indeed directed against the constitutional order.

References

Further reading

External links
 Official Combat 18 website
 Official UK Combat 18 website
 Nick Lowles,"Panorama: Ex-Combat 18 man speaks out", BBC News, 2003
 "Combat 18's hardline racism", BBC News, 19 April 1999
 Stuart Millar, "We're at war and if that means more bombs, so be it...", The Guardian, 27 April 1999
 Incidents attributed to Combat 18 by the START terrorism database

Neo-Nazi organisations in the United Kingdom
Neo-Nazism in Germany
Paramilitary organisations based in the United Kingdom
Neo-fascist terrorism
1992 establishments in the United Kingdom
Organizations established in 1992
Organizations designated as terrorist by Canada
Organizations based in Europe designated as terrorist
Hate crime